Poppaea is a genus of moths of the family Noctuidae containing the sole species Poppaea sabina, known from East Africa.

References

Natural History Museum Lepidoptera genus database

Hadeninae
Owlet moths of Africa
Noctuoidea genera
Monotypic moth genera